Up Above Records is an independent hip hop record label based in Long Beach, California, co-founded in 1995 by Doug "Papadoug" Kato and The Visionaries member KeyKool, along with DJ Rhettmatic and Beat Junkies. The label's first release was a 12" single, KeyKool & Rhettmatic's "Can U Hear It". The single's B-side, "E=MC5" featuring Ras Kass, Meen Green, Voodoo, and Visionaries member LMNO, was deemed "an underground classic" by Source Magazine (Feb. '96).

Up Above Records has built a reputation as vinyl record specialists releasing 12-inch singles (the Jay Dee  J Dilla hip-hop hit "Fuck the Police"), as well as distributing vinyl releases for Jurassic 5, Legendary Music, and other distinguished artists such as Kool G Rap, The Beatnuts, Tony Touch, Dilated Peoples, DJ Spinna, and Sadat X. Up Above Records has also released four moderately successful albums by the Visionaries, along with numerous albums for artists such as those listed below.

Artists
 Blend Crafters (DJ Nu-Mark & Pomo)
 Kev Brown
 Declaime
 Kim Hill
 LMNO
 Key-Kool & Rhettmatic
 Sleep of Oldominion
 SonGodSuns (a.k.a. 2Mex)
 Supernatural
 Camile Velasco
 Visionaries
 Writer's Block (Zen & Dannu)

Vinyl distribution
 Angeles Records (vinyl distribution)
 Jurassic 5 (vinyl distribution)
 Legendary Music (vinyl distribution)

Discography
 Blend Crafters (DJ Numark & Pomo): Self-Titled (2004)
 Kev Brown: I Do What I Do (2005)
 Declaime: Conversations with Dudley (2004)
 DJ Rhettmatic: Exclusive Collection (2004)
 Kim Hill (soul singer): Surrender to My Sunflower (2000)
 Key-Kool & Rhettmatic: Kozmonautz (1995)
 LMNO: This EP Reminds Me of '93 (2004), Economic Food Chain Music (2004), Leave My Name Out (re-issue) (2005), P's & Q's (2005)
 LMNO & Kev Brown: Selective Hearing (2008)
 LMNO & Yann Kesz: Devilish Dandruff With Holy Shampoo (2009)
 Sleep (of Oldominion): Christopher (2005)
 SonGodSuns (a.k.a. 2Mex): Over the Counter Culture (2005)
 Supernatural: S.P.I.T. (Spiritual Poetry Ignites Thought) (2005)
 Visionaries: Galleries (1997-8), Sophomore Jinx (2000), Pangaea (2004), We Are the Ones (We've Been Waiting for) (2006)
 Writer's Block: En Route (re-issue) (2004)

See also 
List of record labels

References

External links
Official site

Record labels established in 1995
American independent record labels
Hip hop record labels